The Peru men's national field hockey team represents Peru in men's international field hockey and is organized by the Federación Deportiva Peruana de Hockey, the governing body of field hockey in Peru.

Peru has never qualified for the Summer Olympics or the World Cup. They have appeared once in the Pan American Games and the Pan American Cup until 2018 but they played their second Pan American Games in 2019.

Tournament record

Pan American Games
 1987 – 10th place
 2019 – 8th place

Pan American Cup
 2000 – 8th place
 2022 – Withdrawn

Pan American Challenge
 2015 – 5th place
 2021 –

South American Games
 2006 – 
 2014 – 6th place
 2018 – 5th place
 2022 – 4th place

South American Championship
 2003 – 
 2008 – 5th place
 2013 – 4th place
 2016 – 5th place

Hockey World League
2016–17 – Round 1

FIH Hockey Series
2018–19 – First round

Bolivarian Games
 2013 – 4th place

See also
 Peru women's national field hockey team

References

field hockey
Americas men's national field hockey teams
National team
Field hockey